Walburg may refer to:

 Saint Walpurga (8th century), also spelled Walburg
 Walburg, Texas (formerly Concordia), unincorporated community in USA
 St. Walburg, Saskatchewan, town in Canada
 St. Walburg, a subdivision of Ulten
 Castle Walburg, a castle in Ohé en Laak, Netherlands

People with the surname Walburg
Marek Walburg (born 1976), Polish football defender

See also
 St. Walburg (disambiguation)
 Walberg, surname
 Wallburg (disambiguation)
 Wahlberg (disambiguation)
 Wallberg (disambiguation)
 Wahlsburg, municipality in Germany
 Walburger